Dmanisi is a town and archaeological site in the Kvemo Kartli region of Georgia approximately 93 km southwest of the nation’s capital Tbilisi in the river valley of Mashavera. The hominin site is dated to 1.8 million years ago. It was the earliest known evidence of hominins outside Africa before stone tools dated to 2.1 million years were discovered in 2018 in Shangchen, China.

A series of skulls which had diverse physical traits, discovered at Dmanisi in the early 2010s, led to the hypothesis that many separate species in the genus Homo were in fact a single lineage. Also known as Skull 5, D4500 is the fifth skull to be discovered in Dmanisi.

History 
The area around the town of Dmanisi has been settled since the Early Bronze Age. In the 6th century an Orthodox Christian cathedral named "Dmanisi Sioni" was built there. The oldest written record of the town is in the 9th century as a possession of the Arab emirate of Tbilisi. Located on the confluence of trading routes and cultural influences, Dmanisi was particularly important, growing into a major commercial center of medieval Georgia. The town was taken by the Seljuk Turks in the 1080s and by the Georgian kings David the Builder and Demetrios I between 1123 and 1125. The Turco-Mongol armies under Timur laid waste to the town in the 14th century. Sacked again by the Turkomans in 1486, Dmanisi never recovered and declined to a scarcely inhabited village by the 18th century. The castle was controlled by the House of Orbeliani.

Archaeological site 

Extensive archaeological studies began in the area in 1936 and continued in the 1960s. Beyond a rich collection of ancient and medieval artifacts and the ruins of various buildings and structures, unique remains of prehistoric animals and humans have been unearthed. Some of the animal bones were identified by the Georgian paleontologist A. Vekua with the teeth of the extinct rhino Dicerorhinus etruscus etruscus in 1983. 

This species dates back presumably to the early Pleistocene epoch. The discovery of primitive stone tools in 1984 led to increasing interest to the archaeological site. In 1991, a team of Georgian scholars was joined by the German archaeologists from Römisch-Germanisches Zentralmuseum, and later the U.S., French and Spanish researchers.

Homo erectus georgicus

Early human (or hominin) fossils, originally named Homo georgicus and now considered Homo erectus georgicus, were found at Dmanisi between 1991 and 2005.  At 1.8 million years old, they are now believed to be a subspecies of Homo erectus and not a separate species of Homo.  These fossils represent the earliest known human presence in the Caucasus.

Subsequently, four fossil skeletons were found, showing a species primitive in its skull and upper body but with relatively advanced spines and lower limbs. They are now thought to represent a stage soon after the transition from Australopithecus to Homo erectus.

Human habitation in the Caucasus goes back to the remotest antiquity.  The hominin remains discovered in 1991 by David Lordkipanidze at Dmanisi, Kvemo Kartli (1.8 million years old) are the oldest found outside Africa. Neanderthal remains have been found at Ortvale K’lde (1973) and elsewhere in the Caucasus (36,000–50,000 years old).

The Dmanisi hominin remains are still making an impact on the paleontological community.  the Dmanisi skull 5 is in the middle of the controversy: many hominin fossils formerly thought to be different species may not have been separate species at all. Several early members of the genus Homo were possibly one evolving lineage.

Gallery

See also 
Prehistoric Georgia
Human evolution
List of human evolution fossils
Kvemo Kartli

References

External links 
Dmanisi archaeological site
 Kalmakoff, Jonathan J. Doukhobor Genealogy Website 

 

Cities and towns in Kvemo Kartli
Prehistoric sites in Georgia (country)
Former populated places in the Caucasus
Buildings and structures in Kvemo Kartli
Tiflis Governorate